Cyperus dilatatus is a species of sedge that is native to parts of Africa.

See also 
 List of Cyperus species

References 

dilatatus
Plants described in 1827
Taxa named by Heinrich Christian Friedrich Schumacher
Flora of Benin
Flora of Burkina Faso
Flora of Chad
Flora of the Republic of the Congo
Flora of the Central African Republic
Flora of Gabon
Flora of the Gambia
Flora of Ghana
Flora of Guinea
Flora of Ivory Coast
Flora of Mali
Flora of Nigeria
Flora of Senegal
Flora of Sierra Leone
Flora of Somalia
Flora of Sudan
Flora of Tanzania
Flora of Uganda